Sir Emile Fashole-Luke KBE  (1895-1980) was Sierra Leonean jurist of Krio ethnicity and former acting Chief Justice and Speaker of the House of Parliament of Sierra Leone from 1968 to 1973. He retired in 1973.

He also served as the Chief Scout of the Sierra Leone Scouts Association.

In 1971, Luke was awarded the 68th Bronze Wolf, the only distinction of the World Organization of the Scout Movement, awarded by the World Scout Committee for exceptional services to world Scouting.

References

1895 births
1980 deaths
Speakers of the Parliament of Sierra Leone
Sierra Leone Creole people
Sierra Leonean knights
Sierra Leonean politicians
20th-century Sierra Leonean judges
Chief justices of Sierra Leone
Knights Commander of the Order of the British Empire
Recipients of the Bronze Wolf Award
Scouting and Guiding in Sierra Leone